Karl Johan Edvardsen (11 November 1883 – 18 September 1963) was a Norwegian politician for the Liberal Party.

He was born in Brunlanes.

He was elected to the Norwegian Parliament from Vestfold in 1950, but was not re-elected in 1954.

Edvardsen held various positions in Brunlanes municipality council between 1919 and 1951, serving as deputy mayor in the periods 1928–1931 and 1931–1934 and as mayor in 1934–1937, 1937–1945, 1945–1947 and 1947–1951. He was also a member of Vestfold county council.

References

1883 births
1963 deaths
Members of the Storting
Liberal Party (Norway) politicians
People from Larvik
20th-century Norwegian politicians